{{DISPLAYTITLE:tRNA (guanine37-N1)-methyltransferase}}

tRNA (guanine37-N1)-methyltransferase (TrmD, tRNA (m1G37) methyltransferase, transfer RNA (m1G37) methyltransferase, Trm5p, TRMT5, tRNA-(N1G37) methyltransferase, MJ0883 (gene)) is an enzyme with systematic name S-adenosyl-L-methionine:tRNA (guanine37-N1)-methyltransferase. This enzyme catalyses the following chemical reaction

 S-adenosyl-L-methionine + guanine37 in tRNA  S-adenosyl-L-homocysteine + N1-methylguanine37 in tRNA

This enzyme is important for the maintenance of the correct reading frame during translation.

References

External links 
 

EC 2.1.1